Daryl, Darryl,  or Daryle Smith may also refer to:

 Daryl Smith (linebacker), American football linebacker
 Daryl Smith (defensive back), American football defensive back
 Daryl Smith (baseball) (born 1960), American baseball player
 Darryl Smith (cricketer) (born 1960), Australian cricketer
 Daryle Smith (1964–2010), American football player for the Dallas Cowboys, the Cleveland Browns, and the Philadelphia Eagles

See also
 Darrell Smith (disambiguation)